Paula Perea Ramírez (born 19 June 1996) is a Spanish footballer who plays as a defender for Real Betis.

Club career
Perea started her career at Sevilla.

References

External links
Profile at La Liga

1996 births
Living people
Women's association football defenders
Spanish women's footballers
Footballers from Seville
Sevilla FC (women) players
Sporting de Huelva players
Real Betis Féminas players
Primera División (women) players